Son Heung-min (born 8 July 1992) is a South Korean professional footballer who plays as a forward for Premier League club Tottenham Hotspur and captains the South Korea national team. Considered one of the best forwards in the world and one of the greatest Asian footballers of all time, he is known for his explosive speed, finishing, two-footedness and ability to link play.

Born in Chuncheon, Gangwon Province, Son relocated to Germany to join Hamburger SV at 16, making his debut in the Bundesliga in 2010. In 2013, he moved to Bayer Leverkusen for a club record €10 million before signing for Tottenham for £22 million two years later, becoming the most expensive Asian player in history. While at Tottenham, Son became the top Asian goalscorer in both Premier League and Champions League history, and surpassed Cha Bum-kun's record for most goals scored by a Korean player in European competition. In 2019, he became the second Asian in history to reach and start a UEFA Champions League final after compatriot Park Ji-sung. In the 2021–22 season, he won, shared alongside Mohamed Salah, the Premier League Golden Boot award with 23 goals, becoming the first Asian player to win it.

A full international since 2010, Son has represented South Korea at the 2014, 2018 and 2022 FIFA World Cups and is his country's joint top scorer at World Cups, tied with Park Ji-sung and Ahn Jung-hwan on three goals. Son has also represented South Korea at the 2018 Asian Games, where the team won gold, and the 2011, 2015, and 2019 editions of the AFC Asian Cup. Korea was the runner-up in 2015. 

Outside of football, Son is viewed as a symbol of national pride in South Korea for his achievements, and has been listed in Forbes Korea Power Celebrity 40 since 2019, where he ranked third in 2022. In June 2022, Son received the Cheongnyong Medal, the highest order of merit for achievement in sports given to a South Korea citizen, for his achievements in football. Son has been credited for having raised the profile of Tottenham Hotspur among South Koreans, with the club's marketing and social media strategy catering extensively to Korean supporters.

Early life
Son Heung-min was born in Chuncheon, Gangwon. His father, Son Woong-jung, is a retired footballer turned manager who once played for the South Korea national B team.

Son came through the academy at FC Seoul, the same club that former Spurs defender Lee Young-pyo played for. Son was a ball boy in an FC Seoul home match in 2008 when he was a FC Seoul youth player. At that time, his role model was midfielder Lee Chung-yong, who played for Crystal Palace and Bolton Wanderers. Apart from his native language Korean, Son is also fluent in German and English. His agent Thies Bliemeister said Son was so determined to make himself a success in Europe that he learned German by watching episodes of SpongeBob SquarePants.

Club career

Hamburger SV
In August 2008, Son dropped out of Dongbuk High School's football club (formerly FC Seoul under-18 team) and joined Hamburger SV's youth academy at age 16 through Korean FA Youth Project. A year later, he returned to South Korea. After participating in the FIFA U-17 World Cup, he formally joined Hamburger SV's youth academy in November 2009

He was impressive in the 2010–11 pre-season, leading the team with nine goals, and signed his first professional contract on his 18th birthday. After scoring against Chelsea in August, he was out for two months due to a foot injury. He returned on 30 October 2010 to score his first league goal, against 1. FC Köln in the 24th minute. The goal made Son the youngest Hamburg player to score a goal in the Bundesliga at 18, breaking the record held by Manfred Kaltz.

Son signed a new deal with Hamburg through 2014. Pundits said he had what it took to become the next Cha Bum-kun, a legendary Bundesliga forward and fellow South Korean. Son scored three goals in 14 matches in all competition during the 2010–11 season.

During the 2011–12 pre-season, Son was explosive, scoring 18 times in only nine matches. After missing the opening match due to a fever, Son scored two goals within three matches. On 27 August, Son picked up an ankle injury in the 4–3 loss to 1. FC Köln and was initially projected to be out of action for four to six weeks. His recovery was quicker than expected and he returned to action only three weeks later as a substitute in a 1–0 loss against Borussia Mönchengladbach on 17 September. Over the course of the 2011–12 season, he made 30 appearances for Hamburg and scored five goals, including crucial goals against Hannover 96 and 1. FC Nürnberg at the end of the season to help ensure that Hamburg remained in the Bundesliga.

Following Hamburger SV's 2012–13 offseason moves, which saw the transfers of the team's strikers Mladen Petrić and Paolo Guerrero to Fulham and Corinthians respectively, manager Thorsten Fink chose to name Son a starter. The 2012–13 season was a breakthrough season for Son as he scored two goals in an away fixture against Borussia Dortmund on 9 February 2013, helping his team to a 4–1 victory. Son was chosen Mann des Tages (Man of the Match) by kicker. On 14 April, Son netted two goals in a 2–1 win against Mainz 05. He finished the season with 12 goals, becoming the fifth South Korean footballer to achieve double digits in goals in Europe. He finished the 2012–13 season with 12 goals in 34 matches in all competitions.

Bayer Leverkusen

On 13 June 2013, Bayer Leverkusen confirmed Son's transfer for reportedly €10 million, which was the highest transfer fee in the club's history at the time. He agreed to a five-year deal with the team. Son adjusted quickly to his new club in the pre-season, scoring three goals in his first three appearances for the team in exhibition matches (against 1860 Munich, Udinese and KAS Eupen respectively).

On 9 November 2013, Son scored a hat-trick for Leverkusen in a 5–3 win against his former club Hamburgers SV. On 7 December, Son scored a crucial goal against Borussia Dortmund to put his club just four points off the summit of the Bundesliga. On 10 May 2014, Son scored another goal against Werder Bremen ensuring his team a spot for the 2014–15 UEFA Champions League. He finished the 2013–14 season with 12 goals in 43 matches.

Son scored a hat-trick against VfL Wolfsburg on 14 February 2015, in a 4–5 defeat, scoring when they were losing 0–3. He finished the 2014–15 season with 17 goals in 42 matches.

Son started the 2015–16 season with Bayer Leverkusen. He made a league appearance and a Champions League qualifying match.

Tottenham Hotspur

2015–16: Debut season
On 28 August 2015, Son joined Premier League club Tottenham Hotspur for £22 million (€30 million) on a five-year contract, subject to work permit and international clearance. Upon his signing, he became the most expensive Asian player in football history. The record had been held since 2001 by Japanese Hidetoshi Nakata, who transferred from Roma to Parma for €25 million.

Son made his debut on 13 September away to Sunderland, being replaced by Andros Townsend in the 62nd minute of a 1–0 win. In Tottenham's first match of the 2015–16 UEFA Europa League on 17 September, Son netted his first two goals for the club in a 3–1 win against Qarabağ FK. Three days later, he scored his first Premier League goal, against Crystal Palace at White Hart Lane, netting in the 68th minute to give Tottenham their first home Premier League win of the season. On 28 December in the match against Watford, Son replaced Tom Carroll in the 80th minute and scored Tottenham's winning goal in the 89th minute. On 2 May, he scored the second goal against Chelsea in a crucial match to give Spurs hope of winning the Premier League. Chelsea equalised in the second half, however, handing over the title to Leicester City.

2016–18: Breakthrough and Premier League runner-up

Before the season, he reportedly asked Spurs manager Mauricio Pochettino for permission to leave Tottenham in an attempt to get more playing time, but was instead given a chance to fight for his place at Spurs. On 10 September 2016, Son scored two goals and created a third in his first appearance of the season, in a 4–0 win against Stoke City. Son followed that performance up with a second brace, coming at Middlesbrough on 24 September, earning his team a 1–2 victory. Upon equalling his league goal total from the previous season in 25 fewer matches, Son was hailed by Pochettino as "a different person – he's more mature and he knows the league and he's settled in fantastically now." Son continued his excellent run of form with his fifth goal in five matches on 27 September in the Champions League. Playing at CSKA Moscow, Son slipped a shot past goalkeeper Igor Akinfeev for the only goal of the match. On 14 October, Son was named the Premier League Player of the Month for September, being the first South Korean and first Asian to receive the award.

Following the Christmas break Son continued to score the odd goal over the following couple of months and then on 12 March 2017 he scored his first Spurs hat trick in the FA Cup against Millwall in a 6–0 win. In the same match, he was racially abused by a section of the Millwall fans who chanted "DVD" and "he's selling three for a fiver" whenever he touched the ball, referencing a stereotype towards east Asians. He scored in the 2–0 victory away at Burnley on 1 April 2017, and four days later he scored in the 91st minute to put Spurs ahead at Swansea, in a game where they were losing 1–0 after 88 minutes and ended up winning 3–1. A brace at home to Watford the following weekend brought his season total to 18 goals, 11 in the Premier League, his best ever goals return. On 12 May 2017, Tottenham announced that Son had won the Premier League Player of the Month for April, the second time of his career and thus becoming the only player in 2016–17 to win the award 2 times. On 18 May 2017, Son bagged a brace away to Leicester City as part of a 6–1 rout of their former title rivals. With 21 goals in all competitions, Son joined Harry Kane and Dele Alli as the first trio of Spurs players with over 20 goals on the season.

Son scored his first goal of the 2017–18 season in the UEFA Champions League game against Borussia Dortmund on 13 September 2017 at Spurs temporary home Wembley Stadium, which Spurs won 3–1. He scored his first Premier League goal in the season when Spurs beat Liverpool 4–1 at home. On 5 November 2017, Son scored the only goal in the 1–0 win against Crystal Palace. The goal brought his tally in the Premier League to 20 and in doing so he became the top Asian goalscorer in Premier League history, breaking the record set by Park Ji-Sung at Manchester United. On 13 January 2018, Son scored a goal and provided an assist in a game against Everton, matching the club record set in 2004 by Jermain Defoe of scoring in five consecutive home games. On 28 February 2018, Son scored a brace and assisted Fernando Llorente as Tottenham beat Rochdale 6–1 in the fifth round of the FA Cup. Son also converted a penalty, but his goal was overruled by the video assistant referee. Son has become the first Asian to finish the season as a top-10 goal scorer in the English Premier League.

2018–19: Champions League runner-up
On 20 July 2018, Son signed a new five-year deal extending his contract with Tottenham until 2023. The first goals of the season came in October 2018 when he scored a brace in his 150th game for Tottenham in the 2018–19 EFL Cup match against West Ham. He scored his first league goal in the season, his 50th goal for the club in all competitions, in a solo effort in the 3–1 home win against Chelsea, inflicting the first defeat for Chelsea in the Premier League this season. This goal won the Premier League's Goal of the Month award for November. On 13 February 2019, Son scored the first goal in a 3–0 win over Borussia Dortmund, in the first leg of the round of 16, UEFA Champions League. At the end of the month he was named Premier League Player of the Year at the London Football Awards. On 3 April 2019, Son scored the very first professional goal at the new Tottenham Hotspur Stadium in a 2–0 victory over Crystal Palace.

On 9 April 2019, Son scored the very first European competition goal at the Tottenham Hotspur Stadium in a 1–0 win against Manchester City in the quarterfinals of the 2018–19 Champions League. In the return leg, Son scored twice to earn Tottenham a 4–4 aggregate win on the away goals rule and help the club reach the semi-finals of the competition for the first time since 1962, and only the second time ever. His brace also saw him become the highest scoring Asian player in the history of the tournament with 12 goals, overtaking the previous record holder, Maxim Shatskikh. On 4 May 2019, Son received his first red card in the Premier League due to his vindictive action against Jefferson Lerma.

2019–20: Puskás Award
Son opened his 2019–20 account on 14 September 2019 by scoring two goals against Crystal Palace in the Premier League with a final result of 4–0. On 21 October, Son was named in the 30-man shortlist for the 2019 Ballon d'Or. On 3 November, Son was sent off during a 1–1 draw with Everton after sliding into André Gomes from behind, causing him to fall awkwardly and suffer a severe ankle injury. The injury prompted great concern and anguish from the players and supporters; Son was visibly highly distressed by the incident. Following a red card for a challenge on Gomes, Son also received suspension for three Premier League games. However, many professionals including former Everton player Kevin Kilbane expressed criticism of the red card decision, and Tottenham made an appeal to the Football Association against the dismissal. The FA accepted the appeal and Son's red card was rescinded on 5 November. Three days after this incident, in a 4–0 Champions League away game to Red Star Belgrade, in which Son scored a brace, rather than celebrating his first goal, he apologised to the camera for what happened at Goodison Park.

On 23 November 2019, Son scored Tottenham's first goal with José Mourinho as manager, earning him Man-of-the-match in a 3–2 Spurs victory against West Ham. On 7 December, in the match against Burnley, Son ran from one end of the pitch to the other, going past seven Burnley players, to score an individual goal that was immediately labelled a goal of the season contender. The nature of the goal saw Mourinho dub him "Sonaldo Nazario" in reference to the type of goal former Brazilian international Ronaldo would score. In January 2020, Son was awarded the Premier League goal of the month for December for his goal against Burnley, eventually winning him the Goal of the Season award. The goal was further recognised by FIFA with a Puskás Award as the best goal of the past 12 months in December 2020.

On 22 December 2019, facing Chelsea, Son was sent off after raising his boot against Antonio Rüdiger's ribs. On 16 February 2020, Son scored two goals at Villa Park and earned a 3–2 victory for Tottenham, in which he became the first Asian footballer to score 50 goals in the Premier League, with 51 scored goals in 151 Premier League matches. Son played the full game despite suffering a fracture to his arm at the 31st second of the game. Head coach José Mourinho declared at a later stage that he was not optimistic regarding Son's injury and that it was likely that the South Korean would be sidelined for the rest of the season.

On 6 April 2020, while football was suspended due to the COVID-19 pandemic in Europe, it was confirmed that Son would carry out his mandatory military service for South Korea. After completing a two-week quarantine on his return to Korea, he served with the Marine Corps for three weeks on Jeju Island.

2020–21: PFA Team of the Year

In the second Premier League match of the 2020–21 season, Son scored four goals, all assisted by Harry Kane, in a 5–2 win against Southampton and the first League win and away win of the season. This was the first time in Premier League history in which a single player scored four goals in a match while being assisted by the same teammate.  In the Premier League game on 4 October, he scored a brace against Manchester United to help Tottenham win 6–1, which is the biggest win for Tottenham at Old Trafford and their best result against United since a home win in 1932. Based on his performances, Son received his third Premier League Player of the Month award on 13 November 2020.

On 28 January 2021, Son's counterpart on the Korean Women's National Team, Cho So-hyun joined FA WSL side Tottenham Hotspur on loan for the remainder of the 2020–21 season. With Son already at the club it gave Spurs the rare distinction of having both the Men's and Women's Korean National Team Captains at one club.

On 2 January 2021, Son scored his 100th goal for Tottenham in the 3–0 win against Leeds. On 10 February 2021, he provided three assists, but Tottenham lost 5–4 to Everton in the FA Cup. On 7 March, Son provided an assist to Harry Kane in a 4–1 win against Crystal Palace, and this, their 14th combined goal effort whereby one assisted another, set a record for the most goal combinations in a single Premier League season. After the end of the season, he and Kane were selected for the PFA Premier League Team of the Year, although Tottenham finished in seventh place.

2021–22: Premier League Golden Boot
On 23 July 2021, Son extended his contract with Tottenham until 2025. On 15 August, he scored his first goal of the season in the opening match against Manchester City, which ended in a 1–0 win. On 4 November, he scored in new manager Antonio Conte's first match in charge, a 3–2 victory over Vitesse in the group stage of the Europa Conference League. In doing so, Son had the distinction of scoring the first goal under each of Tottenham's last three permanent managers.  On 26 February, Son scored a goal against Leeds United in a 4–0 win; the goal was assisted by Harry Kane meaning this was the 37th time Kane and Son had combined to score, which set a new record in goal-scoring partnerships in the Premier League.

On 9 April, Son scored a hat-trick against Aston Villa to give Spurs a 4–0 away win at Villa Park, and also break into Tottenham Hotspur all-time top 10 goalscoring list.

Son scored twice in a 5–0 win against Norwich City on the last day of the season securing a Champions League qualification for Tottenham, after finishing in fourth place in the Premier League, while also winning the Premier League Golden Boot alongside Mohamed Salah with 23 goals, becoming the first Asian player to do so.

2022–23 
After winning the Golden Boot the previous season, Son had a poor start to the 2022–23 season, failing to score any goal in the first eight games and proving only one assist. He ended his goal drought in the game against Leicester City on 17 September, when he came off the bench to score a hat-trick in 13 minutes to help Tottenham win 6–2.

On 1 November, Son collided with Marseille's Chancel Mbemba during the final matchday of the UEFA Champions League group stage. This collision caused Son to suffer an Orbital Fracture in his left eye. Son managed to recover to the point that he would be healthy enough to play in the 2022 World Cup for South Korea, after he declared himself fit to play.

International career

Youth and 2011 Asian Cup
Son was a member of the South Korea national team that participated at the 2009 FIFA U-17 World Cup held in Nigeria. He scored 3 goals in this tournament.

On 24 December 2010, Son was named in South Korea national team's squad for the 2011 AFC Asian Cup, making his debut for the national team in a pre-tournament friendly against Syria on 30 December. At the tournament finals, Son scored his first international goal during a 4–1 group stage win against India. This goal made him the youngest goalscorer in the AFC Asian Cup history

2014 World Cup
On 7 October 2011, after initially missing the first two matches of South Korea's 2014 FIFA World Cup qualification campaign on 2 and 6 September 2011 due to an ankle injury, Son played in a friendly against Poland, and was again featured in 11 October World Cup qualifier against the United Arab Emirates. His selection for national team play was a point of concern for Son's father, however, who caused a stir by asking the Korea Football Association not to select his son for the national team in the immediate future so he can rest and mature more as a player. Cho Kwang-rae, then the South Korea head coach, responded by saying that he would continue to call up Son when needed.

Son turned down the opportunity to participate in the 2012 London Olympics, opting to concentrate on his club career at Hamburger SV. Son was quoted as saying, "In Korea, an Olympic appearance has a special meaning, but I want to speed up for Hamburg. What matters is to pour all my time into team training." Son did, however, play for the national team in the autumn of 2012 for two 2014 FIFA World Cup qualifiers against Lebanon and Iran, and became a regular call-up in friendlies and World Cup qualifying matches in 2013. In the World Cup qualifier against Qatar on 23 March 2013, Son came on as a substitute in the 81st minute and scored the winning goal in the 96th minute.

In June 2014, Son was named in South Korea's squad for the 2014 World Cup. On 22 June, he scored in a 4–2 defeat to Algeria in the team's second group match. The Korea Football Association requested Bayer Leverkusen to allow Son to play in the 2014 Asian Games, as winning the gold medal at the tournament would grant Son exemption from military service. Despite Son affirming his interest and the KFA's efforts, his club at the time, Bayer Leverkusen, refused to release him, as his absence would mean the team would lose him for at least six matches.

2015 Asian Cup
Son was selected for South Korea for the 2015 AFC Asian Cup in Australia. At the quarter-final stage, he scored both of the team's goals in the 2–0 extra time defeat of Uzbekistan. In the final against the hosts, he equalised in added time, but his team lost 2–1 after extra time. He was chosen as one of three forwards in the Team of the Tournament.

2016 Summer Olympics
In June 2016, Son was named as one of the three overage players in  South Korea under-23 squad for the 2016 Summer Olympics. Son amassed two goals in the group stages with a goal against Fiji and another against Germany, helping his team to top the group with two wins and a draw. South Korea was eliminated by Honduras in the quarterfinals, with Son missing crucial chances.

2018 World Cup
On 3 September 2015 at the Hwaseong Stadium, Son scored a hat-trick in an 8–0 home win over Laos in the second round of qualification for the 2018 World Cup.

On 13 June 2017, Son broke his right forearm after falling awkwardly on his arm during a World Cup qualifier match in Doha against Qatar. He was part of the team that saw Korea qualify for the 2018 World Cup after a 0–0 draw against Uzbekistan on 5 September 2017. On 4 June 2018, Son was selected in 23-man squad for the World Cup. On 23 June, Son scored a goal from outside the penalty area – a curling strike into the top corner – though his side was defeated with a 2–1 loss to Mexico in their second group stage match of the World Cup. On 27 June, during their final group stage match, he scored the second goal in the 97th minute in their 2–0 victory over world champions Germany, sealing their elimination.

2018 Asian Games

Son was selected as one of three overage players permitted in the under-23 team for the football tournament at the 2018 Asian Games in Indonesia. He captained the team in the final game of the group stage against Kyrgyzstan, scoring the only goal of the match to help the team reach the knockout rounds. He also captained the team in the knockout rounds and reached the final after the Taeguk Warriors beat Vietnam, 3–1. In the gold medal match, Son assisted in both extra-time goals in a 2–1 victory over Japan, which guaranteed the entire squad's exemption from mandatory military service.

2019 Asian Cup 
Son was called up as captain for the 2019 AFC Asian Cup in the United Arab Emirates by Paulo Bento, but missed the first two group matches due to an agreement with Tottenham Hotspur related to his call-up. He recorded an assist in the third group game against China. However, his play at the tournament was lethargic due to lack of physical strength in his busy schedule, and he returned to London following his team's defeat in the quarter-finals to the eventual champion Qatar.

2022 World Cup 
Still recovering from his eye injury from the match against Marseille, Son was named to lead the 26-man South Korean squad. Due to the tenderness of his injury, Son wore a mask that covered nearly half his face. Son failed to score a goal, but successfully led South Korea to the round of 16, for the first time since 2010, following a match winning assist to Hwang Hee-chan in a 2–1 victory against Portugal on 2 December, before being eliminated by Brazil following a 4–1 defeat on 5 December.

Style of play
Son is a versatile player who can play in any forward position, (winger, second striker, striker) and can even be deployed as an attacking midfielder or wing-back if necessary. He himself has confirmed this, saying, "I don't care where I play. The main thing is I'm in the game. I can play as a second striker or behind. Whatever the coach says, I'll do. I don't have a favorite position. I'll be anywhere and always on the throttle."

Son is known for his two-footed ability, explosive pace, positional sense, movement, close control and clinical finishing which make him especially effective on the counter-attack. Moreover, he has drawn praise from teammates and in the media for his selfless work-rate and defensive contribution, and is capable of providing assists for teammates, in addition to scoring goals himself.

In recent years, particularly following his prolific success with Tottenham, he has been considered one of the best players in the world and has often been cited as the greatest Asian footballer of all time.

Sponsorship and media
Son has a sponsorship deal with sportswear and equipment supplier Adidas. Since 2022, he was selected as brand ambassador for British luxury fashion house Burberry.

On 7 August 2022, Son has been named brand ambassador for Calvin Klein Underwear in South Korea.

Son has two officially licensed NFT collections that have been released in collaboration with NFTStar (a sports fandom social platform with a web3 community) that are available for purchase on OpenSea. His first NFT collection is called the 'NFTStar Fan Pass – Son Heung Min', and the second NFT collection called 'Golden Shiny Boot' was a free mint project available for fan pass holders.

Personal life

Son has dated the K-pop singers Bang Min-ah and Yoo So-young, and is currently single.

Son used the suspension of football during the COVID-19 pandemic to complete South Korean mandatory military service. He was exempted from military service with a gold medal at the Asian Games, but he had to do basic military training regardless of exemption. He completed basic training in the Republic of Korea Marine Corps in Jeju in April–May 2020, finishing in the top five of 157 trainees.

He is also a fan of the video game League of Legends.

In 2019, Son donated around £100,000 to the victims of the Goseong Fire, which left vast devastation in Goseong County, Gangwon, in his native South Korea. In 2020, Son donated £65,000 in aid, to combat the COVID-19 pandemic in South Korea.

Son opened Son Football Academy in his hometown Chuncheon with his father and his brother, at a cost of £11 million paid mostly by him.

Career statistics

Club

International

Scores and results list South Korea's goal tally first, score column indicates score after each Son goal

Honours
Tottenham Hotspur
UEFA Champions League runner-up: 2018–19
EFL Cup runner-up: 2020–21

South Korea U17
AFC U-16 Championship runner-up: 2008

South Korea U23
Asian Games: 2018

South Korea
AFC Asian Cup runner-up: 2015

Individual
FIFA Puskás Award: 2020
Eurosport Player of the Season: 2021–22
Best Footballer in Asia: 2014, 2015, 2017, 2018, 2019, 2020, 2021, 2022
AFC Asian Cup Team of the Tournament: 2015
AFC Asian International Player of the Year: 2015, 2017, 2019
AFC Opta Best XI of All Time (FIFA World Cup): 2020
The Asian Awards Outstanding Achievement in Sports: 2016
AIPS Asia Best Asian Male Athlete: 2018
IFFHS Asian Player of the Year: 2020, 2021, 2022
IFFHS Asian Men's Player of the Decade: 2011–2020
IFFHS Asian Men's Team of All Time: 2021
UEFA Champions League Set-piece Goal of the Season: 2014–15
Bundesliga Debut of the Hinrunde: 2010
Korean FA Player of the Year: 2013, 2014, 2017, 2019, 2020, 2021, 2022
Korean FA Goal of the Year: 2015, 2016, 2018, 2021
Cheongnyong Medal: 2022
Premier League Player of the Month: September 2016, April 2017, October 2020
Premier League Goal of the Month: November 2018, December 2019
Premier League Goal of the Season: 2019–20
Premier League Golden Boot: 2021–22
PFA Fans' Premier League Player of the Month: January 2018
PFA Premier League Team of the Year: 2020–21
BBC Goal of the Season: 2019–20
London Player of the Year (Premier League): 2018–19
Tottenham Hotspur Goal of the Season: 2017–18, 2018–19, 2019–20
Tottenham Hotspur Player of the Season: 2018–19, 2019–20, 2021–22
Tottenham Hotspur Goal of the Decade: 2010–2019

See also 

 List of men's footballers with 100 or more international caps 
 Sport in South Korea 
 Football in South Korea

References

External links

Profile at the Tottenham Hotspur F.C. website

1992 births
Living people
People from Chuncheon
Sportspeople from Gangwon Province, South Korea
South Korean footballers
Association football wingers
Association football forwards
Hamburger SV II players
Hamburger SV players
Bayer 04 Leverkusen players
Tottenham Hotspur F.C. players
Regionalliga players
Bundesliga players
Premier League players
Best Footballer in Asia
South Korea under-17 international footballers
South Korea under-23 international footballers
Olympic footballers of South Korea
South Korea international footballers
2011 AFC Asian Cup players
2014 FIFA World Cup players
2015 AFC Asian Cup players
Footballers at the 2016 Summer Olympics
2018 FIFA World Cup players
Footballers at the 2018 Asian Games
2019 AFC Asian Cup players
2022 FIFA World Cup players
FIFA Century Club
Asian Games medalists in football
Medalists at the 2018 Asian Games
Asian Games gold medalists for South Korea
South Korean expatriate footballers
Expatriate footballers in Germany
Expatriate footballers in England
South Korean expatriate sportspeople in Germany
South Korean expatriate sportspeople in England